The  was a Japanese light bomber of World War II. It was a single-engine, mid-wing, cantilever monoplane of stressed-skin construction with a fixed tailwheel undercarriage and a long transparent cockpit canopy. The type had significance in being the first Japanese aircraft to be powered by a modern two-row radial engine. During the war, it was known by the Allies by the name Ann.

Design and development
The Ki-30 was developed in response to a May 1936 Imperial Japanese Army specification to replace the Kawasaki Ki-3 light bomber with a completely indigenously designed and built aircraft. Mitsubishi and Kawasaki were requested to build two prototypes each by December 1936.

The first Mitsubishi prototype flew on 28 February 1937 powered by a Mitsubishi Ha-6 radial. Originally, designed with a retractable main landing gear, wind tunnel tests indicated that the gain in speed was minimal due to the landing gear's extra weight and complexity and a fixed arrangement with "spatted" main wheels was chosen instead. The wing was mounted at a point above the line of the aircraft's belly in order to fully enclose the bomb bay within the fuselage. The pilot sat just above the leading edge of the wing, and the rear-gunner/radio-operator just behind the wing trailing edge, in a long "greenhouse" canopy which gave both crewmen excellent all-around vision. The Ha-6 engine drove a three-blade variable-pitch propeller.

A second prototype, fitted with the slightly more powerful Nakajima Ha-5 engine, was completed the same month. Although two months behind schedule and overweight, both prototypes met or exceeded every other requirement. These were delivered in January 1938 and the result of the trials was that the Army ordered the Ki-30 into production in March under the designation Army Type 97 Light bomber.

Mitsubishi built 618 production machines through April 1940, and the 1st Army Air Arsenal (Tachikawa Dai-Ichi Rikugun Kokusho) built 68 more by the time production ceased in September 1941. Including prototypes, a total of 704 Ki-30s were built.

Operational history

The Ki-30s were first used in combat in Second Sino-Japanese War from spring 1938. It proved to be reliable in rough field operations, and highly effective while operating with fighter escort. This success continued in the early stages of the Pacific War, and the Ki-30s participated extensively in operations in the Philippines. However, once unescorted Ki-30s met Allied fighters, losses mounted rapidly and the type was soon withdrawn to second-line duties. By the end of 1942, most Ki-30s were relegated to a training role. Many aircraft were expended in kamikaze attacks towards the end of the war.

From late 1940, the Ki-30 was in service with the Royal Thai Air Force, and saw combat in January 1941 against the French in French Indochina in the French-Thai War. 24 aircraft were delivered, and were nicknamed Nagoya by the crews. Additional Ki-30s were transferred from Japan in 1942.

Operators

World War II

Imperial Japanese Army Air Force
No. 82 Dokuritsu Hikō Chutai IJAAF
No. 87 Dokuritsu Hikō Chutai IJAAF
No. 6 Hikō Sentai IJAAF
No. 16 Hikō Sentai IJAAF
No. 31 Hikō Sentai IJAAF
No. 32 Hikō Sentai IJAAF
No. 35 Hikō Sentai IJAAF
No. 90 Hikō Sentai IJAAF

Royal Thai Air Force

Post-war

Chinese Communist Air Force – Operated three captured Ki-30s used as trainers until the early 1950s.

Indonesian Air Force

Specifications (Ki-30)

See also

Notes

Bibliography

External links

 Ki-30 on www.warbirdsresourcegroup.org
 A photograph of Ki-30 in Royal Thai Air Force service

Ki-030
Ki-30, Mitsubishi
Single-engined tractor aircraft
Ki-30, Mitsubishi
Aircraft first flown in 1937
Mid-wing aircraft